Brigitte Blobel (born 21 November 1942) is a German novel writer and screenplay writer from Hamburg. A prolific writer of German books, she is known for writing the Neues vom Süderhof books, on which the TV show was based.

Personal life 
She and her husband primarily live in Hamburg, but also inn Mallorca. She has two children

Bibliography

Children's books 
 Neues vom Süderhof
 Falsche Freundschaft: Gefahr aus dem Internet (2006)

Novels 
 Bis ins Koma (2011)

Diary series 
 Eine Mutter zu viel: Adoptiert wider Wissen (2009)
 Rote Linien – Ritzen bis aufs Blut(2010)
 Herzspring: Wenn Liebe missbraucht wird (1996)
 Die Clique: Wenn die Gruppe Druck macht (2010)
 Alessas Schuld – Die Geschichte eines Amoklaufs (2007)
 Liebe wie die Hölle – Bedroht von einem Stalker (2007)
 Meine schöne Schwester – Der Weg in die Magersucht (2007)

Softcover books 
 Party Girl 2009 
 Blind Date (2011)
 Drama Princess 2008

Films (screenplays written) 
 Una ragazza speciale (A special girl) (2000)

References

1942 births
Living people
Writers from Hamburg
20th-century German novelists
20th-century German women writers
21st-century German novelists
21st-century German women writers